Sherman Wood (born c. 1960) is an American college football coach and former player. He is the head football coach at Salisbury University in Salisbury University, a position he has held since the 1999 season. Wood served as the head football coach at Bowie State University in Bowie, Maryland from 1993 to 1998.

Wood played college football at Salisbury—then known as Salisbury State—as a defensive back, earning NCAA Division III All-America honors.

Head coaching record

References

External links
 Salisbury profile

Year of birth missing (living people)
1960s births
Living people
American football defensive backs
Bowie State Bulldogs football coaches
Salisbury Sea Gulls football coaches
Salisbury Sea Gulls football players
Virginia Union Panthers football coaches
Bowie State University alumni
Coaches of American football from Virginia
Players of American football from Norfolk, Virginia
African-American coaches of American football
African-American players of American football
20th-century African-American sportspeople
21st-century African-American sportspeople